Bonnie Izzard (15 July 1908 – 11 February 1990) was an Australian rules footballer who played with Footscray in the Victorian Football League (VFL).

Notes

External links 
		

1908 births
1990 deaths
Australian rules footballers from Victoria (Australia)
Western Bulldogs players